Игра С Огнём (Playing with Fire) is the fourth album by heavy metal band Aria. It is the first to feature new drummer Alexander Maniakin, and the first after the band split with their longtime manager Viktor Vekshtein.

Track listing

Personnel
Valery Kipelov - Vocals
Vladimir Holstinin - Guitar
Sergey Mavrin - Guitar
Vitaly Dubinin - Bass
Aleksander Maniakin - Drums
Ivan Evdolimov - Sound engineer
Sergey Ryleev - Sound engineer
Aria - Management
Mikhail Mushnikov - Artist
Vasily Gavrilov - Design artist
Georgy Molivin - Photography
Valentin Kudryatsev - Computer design

References

1989 albums
Aria (band) albums